Christopher Michael Sanders (born March 12, 1962) is an American animator, director, screenwriter, producer, illustrator, and voice actor. His credits include Lilo & Stitch (2002) and How to Train Your Dragon (2010), both of which he co-wrote and co-directed with Dean DeBlois, The Croods (2013) with Kirk DeMicco, and The Call of the Wild (2020). He is also known for creating the story behind Lilo & Stitch and for creating and voicing its latter title character in the film and its franchise.

Early life
Sanders was born in Colorado Springs, Colorado. He went to Arvada High School in Arvada, Colorado. He is a 1984 graduate of the California Institute of the Arts.

Career

Walt Disney Feature Animation

Sanders began his career as a character designer for Muppet Babies. He soon became the head storyboard artist for Walt Disney Feature Animation. He also served as a storyboard artist, artistic director, production designer, and character designer on Beauty and the Beast, Aladdin, The Lion King, and Mulan.

In 1985, Sanders created a character named "Stitch" for an unsuccessful children's book pitch. When Sanders was the head storyboard artist for Disney Feature Animation, then-Disney CEO Michael Eisner decided that, in the wake of a number of high-profile and large-budget Disney animated features during the mid-1990s, the studio might try its hand at a smaller and less expensive film. Chris Sanders was approached by Thomas Schumacher to pitch that idea, and Sanders reused the "Stitch" character he came up with. The story line required a remote, non-urban location, so Sanders chose Kauaʻi as the location. Stitch became the central character of the 2002 film Lilo & Stitch, which Sanders co-directed and co-wrote with Dean DeBlois. Sanders would also end up voicing the character he created for the film. The film's commercial and critical success spawned a franchise with three sequel films and three television series, with Sanders reprising his role of Stitch throughout the original 2002–06 run of the franchise (Sanders did not reprise his role for the English dub of the anime Stitch! or the English-language-produced Chinese animated series Stitch & Ai, with Ben Diskin taking over the role for both series), as well in several later Disney crossover works such as Kingdom Hearts Birth by Sleep, Kinect: Disneyland Adventures, and the Disney Infinity series.

In the late 1980s, Sanders created an allegorical picture book entitled The Big Bear Aircraft Company, with the subheading "A book for the big retreat" clarifying that it was created for a Disney offsite event. The Big Bear Aircraft Company is a thinly disguised version of Disney itself, and the book is critical of the creative process at the company, which prioritized "big ideas, figuring they will be big successes" and noted that if proposed aircraft (i.e., movie ideas) "don't look the same as the ones [that were] built before, [the boss, Big Bear] gets uncomfortable." After handing each idea pitched by the "visual engineer" to a writer who "likes airplanes" but "has actually never worked on one before, and couldn't tell you for sure what makes one fly", the story states the assigned writer "is guaranteed of making the same mistakes every time. He will make his airplane look like every one he's seen before ..." In the end, the head of the company, Big Bear, gets an airplane that is "a lot like last year's; not very inspiring and not very memorable. But people bought it before, and they'll probably buy it again. By playing it safe, he's insured his company's survival." However, since it is not the only aircraft company, these policies are destined to leave the company vulnerable to more imaginative competitors "with its wings of good reputation all shot off." The story concludes that Big Bear should instead give the visual engineers "the two things they need to do their job: Bear's trust and time" to allow smaller, more innovative ideas to flourish. Years later, to explain his motivation regarding the piece, Sanders wrote about his concern over "the ever-growing complexity of our films, and what I saw as an emerging pattern they were all cut from", citing the example that during the story development for Mulan, one of the major concerns was the manner of the villain's death rather than the idea that the villain had to die at all. This in turn motivated him to develop Lilo & Stitch, which he summarized as "a story about a villain who becomes a hero."

By December 2006, Sanders had been removed as the director of the upcoming Disney animated film American Dog by John Lasseter. By March 2007, Sanders had been negotiating his exit from Disney. After the departure of Sanders from Disney, directing duties were handed to Chris Williams and Byron Howard, and the film was retitled Bolt. Despite his departure from Disney, Sanders continues to voice Stitch in most official Disney media (except for the aforementioned Eastern-produced shows).

DreamWorks Animation
By March 2007, Sanders had moved to DreamWorks Animation and had then taken over as director on Crood Awakening (later renamed to The Croods), a project previously in co-production with Aardman Animations before their departure from DreamWorks. At the time, Chris had this to say about the move: "I've been so anxious to start working on things, and so I talked to a lot of people... I like the way DreamWorks looks at animation. Animation still has a lot of different places to go, and I don't want to miss out on a chance to try some new things with it."

On September 24, 2008, it was reported that Sanders and DeBlois would be screenwriting and directing How to Train Your Dragon for DreamWorks Animation. The film was released on March 26, 2010, and was well received by critics. It grossed nearly $500 million worldwide. It was nominated for the Academy Award for Best Animated Feature and Best Original Score at the 83rd Academy Awards. The movie also won ten Annie Awards, including Best Animated Feature.

After completing How to Train Your Dragon, Chris returned to The Croods, which was released on March 22, 2013. Sanders shared directing and writing credits with Kirk DeMicco, who had joined in the middle of production. The film proved to be a success, grossing over $500 million. Sanders and DeMicco then worked on The Croods sequel for three and a half years, before its cancellation in late 2016. However, the sequel was revived in September 2017, although with Joel Crawford replacing both Sanders and DeMicco as director. After the sequel was out, now titled The Croods: A New Age, Sanders and DeMicco were both credited for the story while Sanders reprised his role as Belt.

20th Century Studios/return to Disney

In October 2017, it was announced that Sanders would be directing a new film adaptation of the 1903 Jack London novel The Call of the Wild for 20th Century Fox. The film, his live-action and solo directorial debut, was released in February 2020. The film received mixed critical reception, with a 62% approval rating on Rotten Tomatoes, making it the lowest-received film in Sanders's directorial career thus far, and grossed $107.6 million on a budget of $125–$150 million, becoming Sanders's first directorial box-office bomb.

In February 2020, it was reported that Sanders is expected to reprise his voice role of Stitch for a live-action remake of Lilo & Stitch.

Personal life
Sanders is married to Jessica Steele-Sanders. Together, they wrote an illustrated novel, titled Rescue Sirens: The Search for the Atavist (2015). Sanders also draws the webcomic Kiskaloo.

According to Phineas and Ferb co-creator Dan Povenmire, Sanders has a daughter named Nicole.

Filmography

Films

Filmmaking credits

Voice acting credits

Television series

Video games

References

External links
 
 
 
 

1962 births
Living people
American animators
Animators from Colorado
American male screenwriters
American male voice actors
American male video game actors
American storyboard artists
American animated film directors
Animation screenwriters
California Institute of the Arts alumni
Artists from Colorado Springs, Colorado
Film directors from Colorado
Walt Disney Animation Studios people
DreamWorks Animation people
Annie Award winners
Lilo & Stitch (franchise)